The 2010 Singapore Cup (known as the RHB Singapore Cup for sponsorship reasons) started on 24 May 2010. It was the 13th staging of the annual Singapore Cup soccer tournament.

12 S.League clubs and 4 invited foreign teams played in this edition. The cup was a single-elimination tournament, with all sixteen teams playing from the first round. The first round involved one-off matches. Subsequent rounds involved ties of two legs.

The first round kicked off between 24 and 31 May, with the quarter-finals played from 27 September to 15 October, and the semi-finals on 25 to 29 October. The final was played on 14 November.

Teams
S.League Clubs
  Albirex Niigata (S)
 Balestier Khalsa
  Beijing Guoan Talent
  Etoile FC
 Geylang United
 Gombak United
 Home United
 Sengkang Punggol
 Singapore Armed Forces FC (SAFFC)
 Tampines Rovers
 Woodlands Wellington
 Young Lions FC (FAS under-23 team)

Invited Foreign Teams
  South Melbourne
  Bangkok Glass
  Phnom Penh Crown
  Kitchee

Knockout bracket

Preliminary round

Official Website Review

Quarterfinals

First leg

Second leg

Tampines Rovers won 6–1 on aggregate.

Etoile won 6–4 on aggregate.

Bangkok won 6–4 on aggregate.

Lions won 1–0 on aggregate.

Semi-finals

First leg

Second leg

Tampines Rovers wins 3–0 on aggregate.

Bangkok wins 3–1 on aggregate.

Third-place Playoff

Final

Goalscorers

External links
 Official S.League website
 Football Association of Singapore website

2010
Singapore Cup
Cup